The Atsutla Range is a granitic mountain range on the Kawdy Plateau in northern British Columbia, Canada.

References

External links

Mountain ranges of British Columbia
Cassiar Country
Stikine Plateau